Helene Meyers is an American writer, author, and professor. Her work is focused on the intersections of literary and film studies, feminist and queer studies, and Jewish studies.

Biography
Helene Meyers was born in Brooklyn, New York. She received her education at Pennsylvania State University (B.A.), University of Florida (M.A.), and Indiana University (Ph.D.).

Meyers often tacklles feminist, antisemitism, and queer themes as well as literary and film studies. In her book, Movie-Made Jews, she explored the onscreen depictions of antisemitism, assimilation, the Holocaust, queer Jews, intersectional alliances, and feminism. She also argued that movies are important because they help in forming "our images of ourselves, others, and the world." Her works had been published in Lilith, Forward, Tablet, Ms. Magazine’s Blog, the Washington Independent Review of Books, the Chronicle of Higher Education, and Inside Higher Education. Her feminist publications included an analogy of gender discrimination to a component of a Gothic world where women are continuously at risk as they roam the streets, make love in their bedrooms, enter their gynecologists' office, or when they consume and produce culture. 

She serves as Professor of English and McManis University Chair at Southwestern University. She is Jewish, and a native New Yorker.

Bibliography 
 Movie-Made Jews: An American Tradition. Rutgers University Press.
 Identity Papers: Contemporary Narratives of American Jewishness. SUNY Press, 2011.
 Reading Michael Chabon. Greenwood Press, 2010. 
 Femicidal Fears: Narratives of the Female Gothic Experience.

Honors and awards 
 McManis University Chair, 2009
 Brown Senior Faculty Fellowship. 2004-2005
 Fellow of the Summer Institute on the Holocaust and Jewish Civilization. Northwestern University. Summer 2000
 Southwestern University Distinguished Teaching Award. Spring 2000
 Southwestern University Award for Fostering Diversity. Spring 2002
 Brown Faculty Fellowship. Southwestern University. 1994-95
 Cullen Faculty Development Grants. Southwestern University. 1992-2009
 Graduate Council Fellowship. University of Florida. 1983
 University Scholar, Pennsylvania State University. 1982
 Phi Beta Kappa, Pennsylvania State University. 1982

References 

Living people
Jewish American academics
Southwestern University faculty
21st-century American writers
21st-century American women writers
Year of birth missing (living people)
People from Brooklyn
Pennsylvania State University alumni
University of Florida alumni
Indiana University alumni
Jewish American writers